Sir Roger de Pyvelesdon (otherwise 'Puleston' etc.) is cited as Sheriff of Shropshire and Staffordshire c.1240s.

He died in 1272 and his son and namesake Sir Roger de Puleston erected a market cross in his father's memory. This is confirmed in a deed dated 1285, signed by Roger (the son), which included these words: the cross set up for the soul of Roger de Pyvelesdon who died in 1272.

Footnotes

 
 
Medieval English knights
1272 deaths
Year of birth unknown